Barranca (Spanish for "canyon" or "ravine"), may refer to:

Geography

Argentina 
 Barranca Yaco, Viceroyalty of the Río de la Plata, Argentina

Chile
 Barrancas, Pichilemu, a village in Pichilemu

Colombia
 Barrancas, La Guajira, town and municipality of the Colombian Department of La Guajira
 Barranca de Upía, a town and municipality in the Meta Department, Colombia
 Barrancabermeja, Colombia

Costa Rica
 Barranca, a district of Puntarenas, Costa Rica

Guatemala
 Barranca Grande, a city in San Marcos Department, Guatemala
 La Barranca, an aldea of Colotenango, in Huehuetenango, Guatemala
 Aldea La Barranca, Cunén, Guatemala
 Barranca Honda, Jutiapa, Guatemala
 Barranca Seca, Zacapa, Guatemala
 Barrancas, Chiquimula, Guatemala
 Barranca, Izabal, Guatemala
 Barrancas de Galvez, a city in San Marcos Department, Guatemala

Mexico
 Barranca de Otates, a pueblo in Zacoalco municipality, Jalisco, Mexico
 Barranca del Cobre ("Copper Canyon"), Mexico
 Metro Barranca del Muerto, metro station in Mexico City

Peru
 Barranca District, Datem del Marañón in the Loreto Region
 Barranca District, Barranca in the Lima Region
 Barranca Province in the Lima Region
 Barranca, Lima

United States
 Barranca, a town in Rio Arriba County, New Mexico, USA
 Barrancas National Cemetery, a United States National Cemetery located at Naval Air Station Pensacola, in the city of Pensacola, Florida
 Fort Barrancas, in the Warrington area of Pensacola, Florida
 The Barranca, in Newbury Park, California

Fiction
 Las Barrancas, a fictional town in a fictional county in the computer game, Grand Theft Auto
 The guide Barranca in the opening scenes of Raiders of the Lost Ark
 The setting of the 1939 Howard Hawks film Only Angels Have Wings

Music
 La Barranca rock group from Mexico City

See also
 Baranca (disambiguation)